Zotalemimon posticatum is a species of beetle in the family Cerambycidae. It was described by Gahan in 1894. It is known from Vietnam.

References

posticatum
Beetles described in 1894